The Last Voyage is a 1960 Metrocolor American disaster film written and directed by Andrew L. Stone. It stars Robert Stack, Dorothy Malone, George Sanders, and Edmond O'Brien, and features Tammy Marihugh.

The film centers on the sinking of an aged ocean liner in the Pacific Ocean following an explosion in the boiler room.  There are some plot similarities to the disaster involving the Italian liner SS Andrea Doria, which sank after a collision four years earlier.

The ship used in the film was the French luxury liner SS Ile de France, which played a major role during the rescue operations during the Andrea Doria disaster.

Plot
The SS Claridon is an aging transpacific ocean liner, scheduled to be scrapped after just a few more voyages. Cliff (Robert Stack) and Laurie Henderson (Dorothy Malone), and their daughter, Jill (Tammy Marihugh), are relocating to Tokyo and decide to sail there on board the ship. A fire in the boiler room is extinguished, but not before a boiler fuel supply valve is fused open. Before Chief Engineer Pringle (Jack Kruschen) can manually open a steam relief valve, a huge explosion rips through the boiler room, the many decks situated above it, and the side of the ship. Pringle and a number of passengers are killed, and Laurie is trapped under a steel beam in their cabin.

Cliff runs back there and can't get Laurie out alone. He then finds Jill trapped on the other side of the cabin. He tries to use a shattered piece of the bed to get to the other side, but it falls into the hole made by the explosion. Third Officer Osborne believes that the crew should start loading the passengers into the lifeboats, but Captain Robert Adams (George Sanders) is reluctant, as he never lost a ship. Cliff rescues Jill by placing a board for her to crawl across the hole on. Down in the boiler room, Second Engineer Walsh (Edmond O'Brien) reports to Captain Adams that a seam to the bulkhead has broken away. Cliff tries to get a steward's help, but to no avail. A passenger states that he overheard his conversation and wants to help.

Osborne (George Furness) reports that the boiler room is now half full. The ship then begins to transmit an SOS, on orders of Captain Adams. Cliff and a few other men return to his cabin to try to help free Laurie but find that they need a cutting torch.

The carpenter reports to the crew that the boiler room is now two-thirds full. Captain Adams makes an announcement to the passengers to put on their life jackets, and soon after orders they begin loading and launching the lifeboats.

Cliff finds a torch and tries to rush back to Laurie with the help of crewman Hank Lawson (Woody Strode), but they still need an acetylene tank. On instruction from Cliff, Lawson puts Jill in a lifeboat and asks him to return with an acetylene tank. The bulkhead between the boiler room and the engine finally gives way, causing the ship to sink lower. On top of that, a second explosion occurs in the cargo hold, blowing off the cargo hatch on the bow of the ship.

Captain Adams is looking at his promotion letter to commodore of the line while Laurie holds a piece of a shattered mirror in her hand, contemplating suicide to free Cliff from risking his life to save her. She chooses not to do so and tosses it away.

When Cliff and Lawson are in the dining room, it also floods, causing water to burst through the large windows. Captain Adams returns to his office to retrieve the ship's logbook and papers but is killed when the forward smokestack falls on him. Meanwhile, Cliff finally gets the acetylene tank and gets Laurie out from under the steel beam with the help of Lawson and Walsh. They get up to the boat deck along with Osborne and Ragland. As they proceed to the stern where a lifeboat is standing by, Walsh jumps off the ship and swims away from it. Cliff, Laurie, Osborne, Ragland, and Lawson jump into the water and find a lifeboat just as the ship sinks. Cliff personally helps Lawson aboard, in thanks for his devotion to assisting Laurie's rescue, and the narrator concludes with, "This was the death of the steamship Claridon. This was her last voyage."

Cast

 Robert Stack as Cliff Henderson
 Dorothy Malone as Laurie Henderson
 George Sanders as Captain Robert Adams
 Edmond O'Brien as Second Engineer Walsh
 Woody Strode as Hank Lawson
 Jack Kruschen as Chief Engineer Pringle
 Joel Marston as Third Officer Ragland
 George Furness as First Officer Osborne

 Richard Norris as Third Engineer Cole
 Andrew Hughes as Radio Operator
 Marshall Kent as Quartermaster
 Robert Martin as Second Mate Mace
 Bill Wilson as youth
 Tammy Marihugh as Jill Henderson
 Esther Maloney as passenger

Cast notes:
The film was child actress Tammy Marihugh's screen debut. She had previously appeared on television in The Bob Cummings Show.

Production
Stuart Whitman was originally announced for the male lead, and Sidney Poitier for the role of Hank Lawson.

The film originally was scheduled to be shot in CinemaScope off the coast of England, but instead it was filmed almost entirely in the Sea of Japan off the coast of Osaka. The ship used in it was the French luxury liner SS Ile de France, which had been in service from 1927 until 1959, when it was sold to a Japanese scrapyard.

The ship's former owners initially attempted to block Stone's rental of it (for $1.5 million), but withdrew their opposition when MGM agreed not to identify it by its original name when publicizing the film.
The ship was towed to shallow waters, where jets of water shot onto it from fire boats  flooded forward compartments and made it appear that it was sinking by the bow. The forward funnel was sent crashing into the deckhouse and the Art Deco interiors were destroyed by explosives and/or flooded. Because there were too many poisonous jellyfish in the Sea of Japan, the final lifeboat scene was filmed in Santa Monica, California. In his autobiography Straight Shooting, Robert Stack recalled, "No special effects for Andy [Stone]; he actually planned to destroy a liner and photograph the process. Thus began a film called The Last Voyage, which...for yours truly very nearly lived up to its title." According to William H. Miller, American maritime historian, The French Line thereafter forbade any use of the ships they sold for scrap to be used for anything other than scrapping. After the film was finished, the Japanese scrappers raised the ship and towed it to the scrapyard.

The film marked the third and final pairing of Stack and Dorothy Malone. They had previously costarred in the Douglas Sirk films  Written on the Wind (1956) and The Tarnished Angels (1958).

Box office
According to MGM records the film earned $1,060,000 in the US and Canada and $1 million elsewhere resulting in a $551,000 loss.

Critical reception
Bosley Crowther of The New York Times called the film "exciting" and noted "the tension is held unrelentingly until the very end." He added, "Well, almost the end. Let's be honest. Things do finally come to a point where a reasonably realistic viewer is likely to mutter, 'Oh, no!' That's the point where the water in the stateroom is rising above Miss Malone's chin and Mr. Stack, Edmond O'Brien and Woody Strode are still working frantically with an acetylene tank to cut her free. Then the obvious desperation of the problem and the questionable buoyancy of the ship lead one to have misgivings about the reasonableness of Mr. Stone. But up to this point of departure, we have to hand it to him; he has put together a picture that has drama, conviction and suspense. Using as his setting the old condemned liner Ile de France...he has got an extraordinary feeling of the actuality of being aboard a ship, the creeping terror of a disaster, the agony of a great vessel's death. And in all of his performers, especially Miss Malone, he has got a moving reflection of frenzy, futility and fear."

The critic for Time called the film "the most violently overstimulating experience of the new year in cinema: an attempt by two shrewd shock merchants, Andrew and Virginia Stone...to give the mass audience a continuous, 91-minute injection of adrenaline. As a piece of professional entertainment, The Last Voyage is plainly superior to the picture it was patterned after, the British version of the loss of the Titanic. The script takes advantage of its fictional freedom, as the script of A Night to Remember could not, to focus its interest and excite its pace. The scenes of destruction are particularly explicit and dramatic. And yet, in its total effect, The Last Voyage lacks an element essential in all great disasters: dignity. Indeed, the idle depredation of a noble old ship, for the mere sake of salable sensation, may seem to some moviegoers an absolute indignity."

Awards and nominations
Augie Lohman was nominated for the Academy Award for Best Visual Effects.

See also
 List of American films of 1960

References

External links
 
 
 
 

1960 films
1960s disaster films
1960 drama films
American disaster films
American drama films
1960s English-language films
Films about survivors of seafaring accidents or incidents
Films directed by Andrew L. Stone
Films scored by Lalo Schifrin
Films set on ships
Metro-Goldwyn-Mayer films
1960s American films